Eleousa may refer to:

Eleousa icon, a type of icons of the Virgin Mary in the Eastern Orthodox Church
Eleousa, Ioannina, a village in the municipality of Zitsa, Ioannina regional unit, Greece
Eleousa, Thessaloniki, a village in the municipality of Chalkidona, Thessaloniki regional unit, Greece